Roadhouse 66 is a 1984 film directed by John Mark Robinson and starring Willem Dafoe.

The film is set entirely in Kingman, Arizona, and Oatman, Arizona, two towns on historic U.S. Route 66.

Plot
A young adult from New York is on his way to California for a business meeting when he runs into trouble with some local hoodlums in Kingman who shoot at his car and try to run him off the road. He hooks up with a hitchhiker who is also passing through town, who turns out to be a former rock and roll musician, and the two attempt to set things right in the town, culminating in their entry in an automobile race from Kingman to Oatman and back.

Cast
 Willem Dafoe as Johnny Harte
 Judge Reinhold as Beckman Hallsgood Jr. 
 Kaaren Lee as Jesse Duran 
 Kate Vernon as Melissa Duran 
 Stephen Elliott as Sam
 Alan Autry as Hoot 
 Kevyn Major Howard as Dink
 Peter Van Norden as Moss 
 Erica Yohn as Thelma
 James Intveld as James Fury
 Katie Graves as Mary Lou

References

External links
 
 

1985 films
Atlantic Entertainment Group films
1980s road movies
American auto racing films
American road movies
1984 drama films
1984 films
American drama films
1985 drama films
1980s English-language films
1980s American films